Chiara is both a feminine Italian given name and a surname. Notable people with the name include:

Given name
Saint Clare of Assisi, in Italian Chiara d'Assisi
Saint Clare of Montefalco, in Italian Chiara da Montefalco
Chiara Appendino (born 1984), Italian politician 
 Blessed Chiara Badano
Chiara Berti, contestant on US TV show Big Brother 3.
Chiara Aurelia, American actress
Chiara Boggiatto, Italian Olympic swimmer (born 1986)
Chiara Brancati, (born 1981), Italian water polo player
Chiara Caselli, Italian actress
Chiara Civello, Italian singer-songwriter
Chiara Ferragni, Italian blogger and fashion designer
Chiara Galiazzo, Italian singer
Chiara Gensini (born 1982), Italian actress
Chiara Iezzi, Italian singer (born 1973)
Chiara Lauvergnac (born 1961), Italian activist
Chiara Lubich, founder of the Focolare movement
Chiara Mastalli, Italian actress, appears in the HBO series Rome
Chiara Mastroianni, Italian-French actress (born 1972)
Chiara Nappi, Italian physicist
Chiara Neto, Italian chemist
Chiara Porro, Australian diplomat
Chiara Siracusa, Maltese pop singer, best known by the mononym Chiara
Chiara Simionato, Italian speed skater
Chiara Zanni, Canadian voice actress
Chiara Zorzi, regent for her son the Duke of Athens (d. 1454)
Paola e Chiara, Italian sisters and pop singers
Edelfa Chiara Masciotta, Miss Italia for 2005
Chiara Martellaccio, The first known Martellaccio ever to exist on Wikipedia. Saw Andrea Bocelli with her 80yr old aunt.

Surname
Francesca Chiara, Italian singer with the band Lovecrave
Giuseppe Chiara (1602–1685), Italian Jesuit missionary 
Margaret Chiara, U.S. attorney fired by the George W. Bush administration
Maria Chiara, Italian lyric soprano
 (1979), Italian journalist and writer.
Piero Chiara, Italian writer (1913–1986)

See also

Chara (given name)

Italian-language surnames
Italian feminine given names